The Doc Project was a Canadian podcast and radio program, which aired weekly on CBC Radio One. Hosted by Acey Rowe, the program airs radio documentaries, essays, and first person stories each week.

The program debuted in May 2015 as a short-run summer series, and was subsequently extended as part of Radio One's permanent regular season schedule in September. Originally the program was a platform for acquired documentaries and documentaries made through the CBC's Doc Project Mentorship Program. The pieces were sometimes followed by an interview with the documentarian about the process of making the documentary feature. Its first season was hosted by Casey Mecija. Since Rowe's arrival the program has expanded to include commissioned documentaries and co-productions with CBC journalists across Canada. In June 2022 Rowe announced that the show had concluded after seven years.

References

External links

CBC Radio One programs
2015 radio programme debuts
Canadian talk radio programs
Canadian documentary radio programs
Works about documentary film